Hıramo (also, Kharamu and Khyramo) is a village and the least populous municipality in the Lerik Rayon of Azerbaijan.  It has a population of 154.

References 

Populated places in Lerik District